Canik Atatürk Sports Hall is a multi-purpose indoor sport venue located in Canik district of Samsun Province, northern Turkey. It was named in honor of Mustafa Kemal Atatürk (1881–1938), who started the national independence movement in 1919 after setting foot in Samsun.

The venue hosts basketball, handball, volleyball, and table tennis competitions. In December 2013, a second floor was opened featuring a hall for judo, karate and taekwondo events. The sports hall has a seating capacity for 1,000 spectators, including 100 for VIP, 100 for media members, 100 for accredited sportspeople and 100 for physically handicapped people.

International events hosted
2013 FIBA Europe Under-20 Championship for Women took place in the arena. In 2016, the FIBA Europe Under-18 Championship were held in the sports hall. The venue will host judo, karate and taekwondo  events of the 2017 Summer Deaflympics.

References

Sports venues in Samsun
Indoor arenas in Turkey
Basketball venues in Turkey
Handball venues in Turkey
Volleyball venues in Turkey
Canik
Things named after Mustafa Kemal Atatürk